Neu-Homburg Castle is a castle in the municipality of Läufelfingen of the Canton of Basel-Country in Switzerland.  It is a Swiss heritage site of national significance.

See also
 List of castles in Switzerland

References

Cultural property of national significance in Basel-Landschaft
Castles in Basel-Landschaft